Jampur is a capital city of Jampur District, in Punjab province of Pakistan.  It comprises an area of about 2322 square kilometers and has a population of about 87,858 (2017)  It is the capital of Jampur Tehsil. To the west are the high and dry barren mountains of the Sulaiman Range. To the east is the Indus river.

Etymology

The old name of Jampur was Jadam Pur.The word Jampur has two parts: "JAM" and "PUR". "Jadam"(was Jakhar by Caste) faded into "Jam" with the passage of time. "Pur" means "vivified by" or "populated by".

Educational institutes
Jampur is a lightly populated city with a lack of industry, though the land is fertile. One of the main local educational institutes is Govt. Boys High School Jampur which was founded in 1885, as a consequence of the introduction of the British Government system in 1857. Jampur has two public girls high schools for education up to the 10th class. The city has one public college for boys and one for girls.

Medical facilities
Jampur has a Tehsil Headquarter Hospital (T.H.Q) which consists of 1000 beds and many private clinics where specialized doctors serve.

Civil administration
Tehsil Jampur has 19 Union Councils namely:
Allahabad,
Basti Rindan,
Bokhara,
Burrerywala,
Dajal,
Hajipur,
Harrand,
Jampur East,
Jampur Gharbi,
Kot Tahir,
Kotla Dewan,
Kotla Mughlan,
Muhammad Pur,
Noorpur Manjuwala,
Noshahera,
Tal Shumali,
Tatarwala,
Tibbi Lundan,
Wah Leshari

The city used to have tribal and sub-tribal systems due to the Baloch tribes that settled her but is very modern now due to education and access to technology like the internet.

Local tribes include most of Jakhar (Jatt Tribe) Dhandla (Jatt tribe) Khethran (Baloch) Chandia (Baloch), Ghilzai (Pashtun),Syed Tribe(Inayat Shah Grandsons) Ghauri, Mohana, Khokhar, Pitafi (Baloch), Jamali (Baloch), Lashari (Baloch), Leghari (Baloch), Ahmadani (Baloch), Babbar (Baloch), Daya Zat, Sial, Lound, Gorchani, Rind, Mazarin, Mirza, Rata, Manjhota, Arwal, Meo, Niazi, Domki, Muhammadani, Waswani, Mundrani, and other Jat tribes.

See also
Punjab (Pakistan)
Pakistan
Dera Ghazi Khan
Kotla Mughlan
Dajal, Rajanpur

References

Populated places in Rajanpur District